Atoine Maurice Apollinaire, Comte d'Argout (28 August 1782, Veyssilieu, Isère – 15 January 1858, Paris) was a French statesman, minister and governor of the Bank of France.

Life 
He was named Peer of France on 5 March 1819 by the Duke Decazes, and voted with the moderate right. During the July Revolution of 1830, he tried to obtain from Charles X the withdrawal of the July Ordinances which had sparked the riots. A loyal supporter to the Bourbon Restoration, the Comte d'Argout accommodated himself of the new, July Monarchy, which corresponded to his moderate opinions. He was named Minister in Jacques Laffitte's government, succeeding to General Sebastiani. In April 1832, he contracted the cholera but survived to it.

After several other ministerial functions, he was nominated governor of the Bank of France in 1834 and retained his functions until 9 June 1857, despite the institutional changes (1848 Revolutions leading to the establishment of the Second Republic and then the 1851 coup of Bonaparte).

See also 
July Monarchy

1782 births
1858 deaths
People from Isère
French interior ministers
French Ministers of Commerce and Public works
French Ministers of Finance
Members of the Chamber of Peers of the Bourbon Restoration
Members of the Chamber of Peers of the July Monarchy
French Senators of the Second Empire
Governors of the Banque de France
Grand Croix of the Légion d'honneur
Burials at Père Lachaise Cemetery